HMCS Forest Hill ( HMCS Forrest Hill) was a modified  that served with the Royal Canadian Navy during the Second World War. She served primarily as a convoy escort in the Battle of the Atlantic. She was originally laid down by the Royal Navy as HMS Ceanothos but was never commissioned into the RN, being transferred to the RCN before completion. She is named for Forest Hill, Ontario, a town that was eventually amalgamated into the larger city Toronto, Ontario.

Background

Flower-class corvettes like Forrest Hill serving with the Royal Canadian Navy during the Second World War were different from earlier and more traditional sail-driven corvettes.  The "corvette" designation was created by the French as a class of small warships; the Royal Navy borrowed the term for a period but discontinued its use in 1877. During the hurried preparations for war in the late 1930s, Winston Churchill reactivated the corvette class, needing a name for smaller ships used in an escort capacity, in this case based on a whaling ship design. The generic name "flower" was used to designate the class of these ships, which – in the Royal Navy – were named after flowering plants.

Corvettes commissioned by the Royal Canadian Navy during the Second World War were named after communities for the most part, to better represent the people who took part in building them. This idea was put forth by Admiral Percy W. Nelles. Sponsors were commonly associated with the community for which the ship was named. Royal Navy corvettes were designed as open sea escorts, while Canadian corvettes were developed for coastal auxiliary roles which was exemplified by their minesweeping gear. Eventually the Canadian corvettes would be modified to allow them to perform better on the open seas.

Construction
Ceanothos was ordered 22 July 1942 as part of the Royal Navy 1942–43 Increased Endurance Flower-class building program. She was laid down 5 February 1943 by Ferguson Bros. Ltd. at Port Glasgow, Scotland and launched 30 August 1943. As part of an exchange for s that the RCN intended to use as convoy escorts, the Royal Navy transferred four Flower-class corvettes and twelve s to Canada in order to acquire them. Ceanothos was transferred on 1 December 1943 and commissioned as HMCS Forrest Hill into the RCN on the River Clyde. The only significant differences between the RCN and RN 1942–43 Flower classes was a shortened mainmast and varying anti-aircraft armament.

During her career, Forrest Hill had one significant refit. It took place at Liverpool, Nova Scotia from December 1944 until February 1945.
[[File:H.M.C.S. Forest Hil ship's mascots, "Sad-Sad" the kitten and "Screech" the dog (12329051613).jpg|thumb|Forest Hill'''s ship's mascots, "Sad-Sad" the kitten and "Screech" the dog]]

Service history
After commissioning, Forrest Hill was sent to work up at Tobermory, the location of the Royal Navys convoy escort training centre. After working up, she was assigned to the Mid-Ocean Escort Force as a trans-Atlantic convoy escort. She was allocated to escort group C-4 and served with the group until departing for refit in December 1944.

After the refit she worked up in Bermuda. Upon her return she was assigned to Halifax Force in April 1945 as a local escort and patrol duty. She remained with the unit until the end of the war.Forrest Hill'' was paid off 9 July 1945 at Sorel, Quebec. She was transferred to the War Assets Corporation and sold for scrapping. She was broken up in 1948 at Hamilton, Ontario.

Notes

External links

 
 

 

Flower-class corvettes of the Royal Canadian Navy
1943 ships